Gabriele Tagliaventi (born 1960 in Bologna, Italy) is an Italian architect and a figure of the movement for the European Urban Renaissance and the New Urbanism in Europe.

Biography
Tagliaventi was coordinator of the EU Program on medium-sized cities from 1993 to 1996 and visiting professor at the University of Miami-School of Architecture from 1995 to 1997. Authors of various projects of architecture and town-planning, has received the 1st Prize at the International Competition for the Reconstruction of the Laeken Street in Bruxelles (1989), one of the five 1st Prizes at the International Competition for the Reconstruction of the Warsaw City Core (1992), the 1st Prize at the International Competition for the Reconstruction of the Marsham Street area in London (1996).

Among his main works are the redevelopment of a mixed-use block in the Urban periphery of Bologna, Zanolini Street (1988–93), the construction of 2 mixed-use buildings in Laeken Street, Bruxelles, the new Urban Neighborhood "Città Nuova" in Alessandria (with Leon Krier), the redevelopment of a mixed-use urban block in Valenza, Italy, the project for a group of mixed-use buildings in the Quartier am Tacheles in Berlin Mitte, the project for the completion of the Historical centre of Piove di Sacco, Italy, the project for 2 urban blocks in the new town of Val d’Europe, France, the new urban centre at Magny-le-Hongre, the Golf Village at Bailly* Romainvilliers
Since 1992 Gabriele Tagliaventi is the curator of the A Vision of Europe Triennale International Exhibition of Bologna and of the "Urban Renaissance" and “The Other Modern” travelling exhibitions in Istanbul, Turkey Oslo, Norway Bruxelles, Belgium San Sebastian, Spain Lisbon, Portugal Berlin, Germany Strasbourg, France in 1996–2001.
Vice-director of the A&C INTERNATIONAL, journal on architecture and urbanism, among his various publications are: "Alla Ricerca della Forma Urbana", Patron Ed. (Bologna 1988) "A Vision of Europe", Alinea Ed., (Florence, 1992) "Garden Cities. A Century of Ideas, Projects, Experiences", Gangemi Ed. (Roma, 1994) "Urban Renaissance", Grafis Ed. (Bologna 1996), "The Other Modern 1900–2000" (Savona, 2000), “New Civic Architecture” (Alinea 2004)

Main works of architecture and urbanism 

 1988–1990, project (with Ivo Tagliaventi) of the new Piazza della Repubblica in Zola Predosa, Bologna
 1989, first prize at the International Competition for the Reconstruction of a Historic Street in Bruxelles
 1992, (with Liam O'Connor) first prize (ex-aequo) at the International Competition for the Reconstruction of Warsaw City Core, Warsaw, Poland
 1990–1995, two residential/commercial buildings (Lots 1A, 1B) in the Historic Centre of Bruxelles, Laeken Street
 1989–1994, (with Ivo Tagliaventi) reconstruction and extension to a mixed urban building complex in Bologna, Zanolini Street
 1992–1994, (con Ivo Tagliaventi) project for the new Day-Hospital of Zola Predosa, Bologna
 1994–1995 project for the redevelopment of the Historic centre in Chinon, France
 1995–1996, project for the new Cultural Centre of the city of Biarritz, France
 1994–1996, project for the urban redevelopment of the Lecourbe and Vaugirards streets in Paris
 1996, awarded a prize at the International Competition for the University College of South Stockholm, organised by the Swedish Government-Department of Public Works
 1996, first prize at the International Competition for the redevelopment of the Marsham Street area in London, organised by the British Government - Department of the Environment
 1997, selected among the seven finalists at the International competition for the New Centre for the Architecture and the City, organised by the Belgian Government
 1995–2002, (with Leon Krier) new centre for the "Pista" Quarter in Alessandria, Italy (built)
 1997–2002, (with Leon Krier) project for the redevelopment of a mixed-use block in the centre of the city of Valenza, Italy (built)
 1998–1999, projects for 2 town-houses in Bologna (built)
 1999, finalist at the International Competition for the new campus of the Louis Armstrong High School for the Arts (LAHSA), Lafayette, Louisiana
 2001 project for the reconstruction of 2 town-houses in the centre of Dresden – Quartier am Neumarkt
 2000–2005 project for a group of mixed-use buildings in the Johannisviertel neighborhood – Quartier am Tacheles in Central Berlin developed by the Fundus Group, within the masterplan designed by DPZ (building permit)
 2002–2005 project for an urban block with residential, offices, retails and a public elementary school in the town of Piove di Sacco (building permit)
 2002–2007 masterplan for the re-urbanization of an area in the suburbs of Bologna and project for a new urban neighborhood in the area of Via della Pietra, Bologna (under construction)
 2002–2007 masterplan for a new urban neighborhood in the area of Viale Salvemini, Bologna (under construction)
 2002–2005 project for a complex of residential, commercial and office buildings in the city of Valenciennes, France (under construction)
 2004–2005 project for 2 urban blocks in the new town of Val d’Europe, France for Disney Resort Paris (under construction)
 2005–2007 project for a new residential village in the town of Bailly-Romainvilliers, France (building permit)
 2006–2007 project for a new village center in the city of Magny-le-Hongre, France (building permit)

Main publications 

 September 1992, (with Liam O'Connor) "A Vision of Europe. International Exhibition of Architecture and Urbanism", catalogue of the Bologna Triennale I of Architecture and Urbanism, Alinea Editions, Firenze
 March 1994, "Garden Cities", Gangemi Editions, Roma
 March 1996, "Urban Renaissance", catalogue of the Bologna Triennale II of Architecture and Urbanism, Grafis Editions, Bologna
 March 2000, "The Other Modern 1900–2000. Classical and Traditional Architectures in the Construction of the 20th century city", Dogma Editrice, Savona
 October 2000, "Tecniche e Tecnologie dell'Architettura tra Eclettismo e Storicismo", Alinea Editore, Firenze
 June 2002, “New Urbanism”, A&C Documents N.1, Alinea Editrice, Firenze
 October 2004, “New Civic Architecture. The Ecological Alternative to Sub-Urbanization”, Alinea Editrice, Firenze
 January 2007, “Manuale di Architettura Urbana”, Pàtron Editore, Bologna 2007

References

External links
A Vision of Europe

1960 births
Living people
New Urbanism
New Classical architects
Italian urban planners
Architects from Bologna
20th-century Italian architects
21st-century Italian architects